Kilikkonjal is a 1984 Indian Malayalam-language drama film directed by V. Ashok Kumar and written by George Onakkoor from a story by Kuruvila Kayyalakkal; it was produced by Edappazhinji Velappan. It stars Mohanlal, Pyarelal, Ranipadmini, and Adoor Bhasi. The film has a musical score by Darsan Raman.

Plot

Cast
Mohanlal
Pyarelal
Adoor Bhasi
Ranipadmini
Mucherla Aruna
Jayamalini
K. P. A. C. Sunny
Unni Mary
Poojappura Ravi

Production
Mohanlal's elder brother Pyarelal debuted as an actor in the film, appearing in an important character.

Soundtrack
The music was composed by Darsan Raman and the lyrics were written by Bichu Thirumala.

References

External links
 

1984 films
1980s Malayalam-language films